Amata multifasciata is a moth of the subfamily Arctiinae. It was described by George Hampson in 1892. It is found in the Indian states of Sikkim and Assam.

References

multifasciata